is a station on the Tama Toshi Monorail Line in Hachiōji, Tokyo, Japan.

Lines
Chūō-Daigaku-Meisei-Daigaku Station is a station on the Tama Toshi Monorail Line and is located 13.4 kilometers from the terminus of the line at Kamikitadai Station.

Station layout
Chūō-Daigaku-Meisei-Daigaku Station is an above-ground station with two tracks and two side platforms. Unusually for the Tama Monorail Line, the station is not elevated.

Platforms

History
The station opened on 10 January 2000.

Station numbering was introduced in February 2018 with Chūō-Daigaku-Meisei-Daigaku being assigned TT04.

Surrounding area
The station is between two major university campuses: the Tama campus of Chūō University and the Hino campus of Meisei University. As such, the station concourse often becomes crowded with students heading to and from the universities, sometimes more than the station can handle. Other points of interest include:
 Tokyo Metropolitan Route 156

References

External links

 Tama Monorail Chūō-Daigaku-Meisei-Daigaku Station 

Railway stations in Japan opened in 2000
Railway stations in Tokyo
Tama Toshi Monorail
Hachiōji, Tokyo